Nizamabad (Urban) Assembly constituency is a constituency of Telangana Legislative Assembly, India. It is one among 2 constituencies in the City of Nizamabad with a population of 3,11,152. It is part of Nizamabad Lok Sabha constituency.

Bigala Ganesh of Telangana Rashtra Samithi is currently representing the constituency for the second time.

Extent of the constituency 
The Assembly Constituency presently comprises the following :

Members of Legislative Assembly

Election results

Telangana Legislative Assembly election, 2018

Telangana Legislative Assembly election, 2014

Andhra Pradesh Legislative Assembly election, 2009

See also
Nizamabad (Rural) (Assembly constituency)
 List of constituencies of Telangana Legislative Assembly

References

Assembly constituencies of Telangana
Nizamabad district